John S. Smith may refer to:

 John Shuter Smith (died 1871), Canadian lawyer
 John Sidney Smith (legal writer) (1804–1871), English legal writer
 John Sidney Smith (rugby union) (1860–?), English rugby union forward
 John Speed Smith (1792–1854), American politician
 John Stafford Smith (1750–1836), British composer
 John Samuel Smith (1841–1882), New South Wales politician
 John Spencer Smith (1769–1845), British diplomat, politician and writer
 John Smalman Smith, British judge in the Colony of Lagos